Husseren-Wesserling is a commune in the Haut-Rhin department in Grand Est in north-eastern France.

Points of interest
 Parc de Wesserling

See also
 Communes of the Haut-Rhin département

References

Communes of Haut-Rhin